The men's triple jump at the 2019 World Athletics Championships was held at the Khalifa International Stadium in Doha from 27 to 29 September 2019.

Summary
On the second jump of the competition, Will Claye took the lead with a 17.61m.  Two jumpers later, Cristian Nápoles went 17.36m, then Pedro Pablo Pichardo, now jumping for Portugal, jumped 17.49m.  That held through the round.  In the second round, Claye improved to 17.72m and Nápoles improved to 17.38m before Hugues Fabrice Zango bounded into contention with a 17.46m African record.  After two rounds, defending everything Christian Taylor had not landed a legal jump.  Faced with do or die, Taylor made 17.42m to be allowed to continue in the competition.  After Claye improved to 17.74m and Pichardo improved to 17.62m, Taylor's fourth attempt of 17.86m put him into the lead.  In the fifth round, Zango improved the African record to 17.56m but still wasn't on the podium, while Taylor produced the capper .  The only one to improve in the final round was Zango, his third African record of the competition was yet another 10 cm improvement to 17.66 to snatch the bronze medal.

Since 2011 the triple jump story remains virtually the same, Taylor in first, his former University of Florida teammate, Claye slightly behind.

Records
Before the competition records were as follows:

The following records were set at the competition:

Qualification standard
The standard to qualify automatically for entry was 16.95 m.

Schedule
The event schedule, in local time (UTC+3), was as follows:

Results

Qualification
Qualification: Qualifying Performance 17.10 (Q) or at least 12 best performers (q) advanced to the final.

Final
The final was started on 29 September at 21:46.

References

Triple jump
Triple jump at the World Athletics Championships